Marcelo Falcão Custódio (born May 31, 1973, in Rio de Janeiro) is a Brazilian musician, the lead singer of the group O Rappa.

Falcão was born and grew up in Engenho Novo, Rio de Janeiro.

He sang with Marcelo D2 in his version of "Hey Joe", popularized in the voice and guitar of Jimi Hendrix, and covered by several big names in rock and pop music in general and Seal, Paul Rodgers, Steve Ray Vaughan, Brian May, David Gilmour, commonly performed in group shows like Guitar Legends (Barcelona, 1992).

Early life 
Marcelo Falcão was born on May 31, 1973, in the Engenho Novo neighborhood of Rio de Janeiro, where he was raised. He was the one of the two sons of Ademir Custódio and Maria Selma Falcão Custódio.

Discography

Solo 
 2019 – Viver (Mais Leve Que O Ar)

with O Rappa 

Studio albums
 1994 – O Rappa
 1996 – Rappa Mundi
 1999 – Lado B Lado A
 2003 – O Silêncio Q Precede O Esporro
 2008 – 7 Vezes
 2013 – Nunca Tem Fim...

Live albums
 2001 – Instinto Coletivo Ao Vivo
 2005 – Acústico MTV
 2010 – Ao Vivo
 2016 – Acústico Oficina Francisco Brennand

DVDs
 2004 – O Silêncio Q Precede O Esporro 2005 – Acústico MTV 2008 – 7 Vezes (Musical Video Interactive)
 2010 – Ao Vivo 2016 – Acústico Oficina Francisco Brennand''

References

1973 births
21st-century Brazilian male singers
21st-century Brazilian singers
Brazilian baritones
20th-century Brazilian male singers
20th-century Brazilian singers
Brazilian male guitarists
Brazilian songwriters
Brazilian composers
Musicians from Rio de Janeiro (city)
Living people
21st-century guitarists